Dhaulakuan or Dhaula Kuan is a small town in the Paonta Sahib tehsil of Sirmour district in the northern Indian state of Himachal Pradesh.  It is located between Nahan, one of the tehsils of Sirmour district, and Paonta Sahib.  It lies on National Highway 72 between Dehradun and Shimla.  It is situated on the foothills between Renuka and Dadahu, another town in Nahan tehsil.

Dhaulakuan is the location of the Hill Agricultural Research and Extension Centre, and the Dhaulakuan Horticulture University of Himachal Pradesh.

Several types of oranges are grown there.  The fertile paonta valley starts from this place.  A little away from Dhaula kuan there is Katasna Devi Temple where Raja Jagat Singh defeated the advancing army of Gulam Quadir rohilla in a great battle.  The victory is commemorated in Devi Temple, built in gratitude by Raja.

Giri Nagar is situated 5 km from Dhaula Kuan, along the highway from Nahan to Paonta Sahib.  Giri Nagar has a power plant with a capacity of 60 MW capacity, constructed after diverting the Giri river through a 6 km tunnel.  Electricity produced at the plant is transmitted to the states of Uttar Pradesh and Punjab.

Many new industries are being set up in the town. 

Cities and towns in Sirmaur district